The Orlando Magic are an American professional basketball team based in Orlando, Florida. They play in the Southeast Division of the Eastern Conference in the National Basketball Association (NBA). The franchise was founded in 1989 as an expansion team, and plays at the Amway Center. The team is owned by Orlando Magic, Ltd., a subsidiary of RDV Sports, Inc. The team has won six division titles (1995, 1996, 2008, 2009, 2010, 2019), two conference titles (1995, 2009), but no league championships.

There have been thirteen head coaches for the Magic franchise. The team's first head coach was Matt Guokas, who coached the team for 328 games over four seasons. Brian Hill is the team's all-time leader in regular-season games coached (459). Hill is also the team's all-time leader in regular-season games won (267), and he is the team's only coach to have coached during two non-consecutive periods. He is the team's all-time leader in playoff games coached (59), playoff games won (31), regular-season winning percentage (.657), and playoff winning percentage (.523). Doc Rivers is the team's only coach to have won the NBA Coach of the Year award, winning it after the 1999–2000 season. Chris Jent is the team's only head coach to have spent his entire career with the Magic.

On July 28, 2012, Jacque Vaughn was named the new head coach. He was the assistant coach for the San Antonio Spurs in the two seasons prior to his hiring.

On May 29, 2015, the Magic hired their former point guard Scott Skiles as the franchise's 12th head coach.

When Skiles resigned after one season, the Magic hired Frank Vogel as his successor. Vogel was fired following the end of the 2017–18 season. Steve Clifford was the most recent head coach, serving from 2018 until his resignation in 2021.

Key

Coaches

Notes
 A running total of the number of coaches of the Magic. Thus any coach who has two or more separate terms as head coach is only counted once.
 Each year is linked to an article about that particular NBA season.

References
General

Specific

Lists of National Basketball Association head coaches by team

Head coaches